is a Japanese black and white anime television series created by Kazuya Fukumoto and Yoshikatsu Miyakoshi. The show aired in the United States in 1966 as Zoran, Space Boy. The series was released on DVD in 2015.

Plot
Dr. Tachibana once designed the highly dangerous antiproton bomb and planned to escape Earth with his wife and children for fear of prosecution. On their way in space, their space ship is almost destroyed and only Dr. Tachibana's children, his son and his daughter, escape. The son is rescued by aliens called the Soran who live on a planet with 15 times the gravity of Earth. They name him Soran after their planet and is turned into a cyborg to save his life. He returns to Earth to search for his sister who escaped, but is yet to be found. He then lives with the archaeologist Dr. Kotsuki and his daughter Mika. and teams up with his pet squirrel, Chappy.

Wonder Three incident
The character of Chappy was believed to be ripped off of a character Osamu Tezuka was creating. In fear of plagiarising, Tezuka's Wonder Three manga had to be serialized in Weekly Shōnen Sunday instead of Weekly Shōnen Magazine, where the Soran manga was serialized. This is actually called the "Wonder Three incident" (W3事件). Chappy appeared to be like the initial design for Bokko, who was supposed to be a squirrel; she was thus changed to a rabbit. Yoshikatsu Miyakoshi was also a former worker for Tezuka. Several members of Mushi Productions were fired or left due to suspicion of industrial espionage.

References

Kodansha manga
Shōnen manga